Hindon Elevated Road is a 10.3 km long, grade separated expressway located in Ghaziabad, Uttar Pradesh. It connects Raj Nagar Extension in the city to UP Gate at the border with Delhi. The road was built at a cost of Rs. 1,147 crores. The entire stretch is built on 228 single-pier pillars. The road also connect commuters to NH-24 also known as Delhi–Meerut Expressway.

See also 
 Expressways in India
 Delhi Noida Direct Flyway

References 

Roads in Uttar Pradesh
Transport in Ghaziabad, Uttar Pradesh